Buy now, pay later (BNPL) is a type of short-term financing that allows consumers to make purchases and pay for them at a future date. BNPL is generally structured like an installment plan money lending process that involves consumers, financiers, and merchants. Financiers pay merchants on behalf of the consumers when goods or services are purchased by the latter. These payments are later repaid by the consumers over time in equal installments. The number of installments and repayment period varies depending on the BNPL financiers.

History
The earliest form of BNPL traces back to the 19th century, when installment plans emerged as a way for consumers to purchase expensive goods (e.g. furniture, pianos and farm equipment) they did not have the funds to buy outright. In India, BNPL is considered similar to the country's traditional paper-based Udhar Khata system, where corner shops, known as kiranas locally, kept manually logged credit ledgers to allow their customers to buy provisions on credit and repay them later.

In the early 21st century, fintech companies developed systems that allowed installment plan lending to be integrated into the payment flow of online shops, allowing a consumer to receive instant credit at the point of sale and pay for a purchase later, based on an agreed schedule. The integration and instant processing elements are what sets BNPL apart from other approaches to consumer lending.

Usage
BNPL has been described as "similar to a credit card but without the hassles of an application process, card-swiping infrastructure, and separate limits for purchases and cash withdrawals". Retailers that partner with BNPL financiers can offer customers the option to pay for purchases using BNPL. If a customer opts to complete the purchase using BNPL, the financier will typically carry out a soft credit check on the customer, and return a decision within seconds. The financier pays the merchant if approval is received, and offers the customer various repayment options. These may include delaying the payment for a short period of time, or spreading the full balance over several smaller payments.

The service is offered for free to the customer, assuming repayment is made. BNPL financiers take a cut from the purchase price of anything they help the merchant to sell. This fee tends to be higher than typical credit or debit card transactions, with processing fees ranging from 2% to 8% per transaction, compared to 1.3% to 3.5% for credit cards.

When consumers fall behind on payments, late fees are typically charged by their financiers, and persistently delinquent accounts may be sold to debt collection agencies.

Issues and criticisms

Normalising debt
BNPL has been criticised for instilling a false sense of financial security in consumers, which could lead to impulse shopping and they might end up spending money they do not have. Influencer marketing of BNPL platforms on social media adds to the attractiveness of using BNPL credit to purchase items, and influencers have been criticised for normalising debt by marketing it as "fun", thereby encouraging overspending.

Lack of regulatory oversight
Consumers that use BNPL generally are less protected by regulation, as compared to other financing options. The BNPL industry remains unregulated or self-regulated in many countries. The BNPL Code of Practice is a voluntary code of conduct developed by the Australian Finance Industry Association (AFIA) for the buy now, pay later (BNPL) industry. The Code sets out best practices and standards for BNPL providers, including providing clear and transparent information to customers, offering fair and flexible repayment options, and protecting customers from potential harm.

The Code took effect on March 1, 2021 and applies to all AFIA members that offer BNPL services in Australia. The Code aims to provide greater transparency, fairness, and protection for BNPL customers in Australia.

Although BNPL payments are usually interest-free, financiers have been noted to report defaults more frequently than successful repayments to credit-reporting agencies, potentially putting the credit rating of consumers in jeopardy. Checks conducted by financiers on credit bureau scores have also been critiqued for being scant. These checks are cursory, if conducted at all, and mainly evaluate income statements only.

See also 
 Layaway
 Debt
 Credit

Notes

References 

Contract law
 
Credit
Personal financial problems
Sales
Online payments